The General Scholastic Ability Test is the Taiwanese university entrance exam. The test is administered over two days and five subjects 
 Chinese language and literature
 English language
 Mathematics
 Social studies (including History, Geography, and Civics)
 Science (including Physics, Chemistry, Biology and Earth Science)
The materials cover the first two years of Taiwanese senior high school (10th and 11th grade).

In recent years, the test has attempted to encourage students to read outside of their classwork and  be attuned to current events by including questions related to the Ebola virus, climate change, 3G technology, and popular comic figures such as Spider-Man.

References

External links
 大學招生委員會聯合會　

Academic pressure in East Asian culture
Education in Taiwan
Standardized tests